2010 Júbilo Iwata season

Competitions

Player statistics

Other pages
 J. League official site

Jubilo Iwata
Júbilo Iwata seasons